Oluwapelumi Emmanuel Adeyemo (born 21 May 2002) is a Nigerian professional footballer who plays as a midfielder for the club Vizela in the Primeira Liga.

Professional career
A youth product of the Nigerian academy Triple 44, Adeyemo signed a 4 year contract with the Portuguese club Vizela on 22 January 2021. He shortly after went on loan with Pedras Salgadas for the rest of the 2020-21 season. He made his professional debut with Vizela in a 2–1 Taça da Liga loss to Estrela on 24 July 2021.

References

External links
 
 

2002 births
Living people
Sportspeople from Ibadan
Nigerian footballers
F.C. Vizela players
Association football midfielders
Nigerian expatriate footballers
Nigerian expatriate sportspeople in Portugal
Expatriate footballers in Portugal